Edmund Gheast (also known as Guest, Geste or Gest; 1514–1577) was a 16th-century cleric of the Church of England.

Life
Guest was born at Northallerton, Yorkshire, the son of Thomas Geste. He was educated at York Grammar School and Eton College and became a scholar of King's College, Cambridge in 1536 (fellow from 1539 to 1554, BA in 1541, MA in 1544, BD in 1551).

He was chaplain to Archbishop Matthew Parker who made him Archdeacon of Canterbury (1559–1564) and Rector of Cliffe, Kent. He became Bishop of Rochester in 1560, holding the office of Archdeacon of Canterbury in commendam. He was then Bishop of Salisbury from 1571 to his death in 1577. He was buried in Salisbury Cathedral.

Guest participated actively in the Convocation of 1563 that met under Archbishop Matthew Parker to revise the Forty-Two Articles. Convocation passed only 39 of the 42, and Queen Elizabeth reduced the number to 38 by throwing out Article XXIX to avoid offending the Roman Catholic party. In 1571, the XXIXth Article, despite the opposition of Guest, was inserted, to the effect that the wicked do not eat the Body of Christ. The Thirty-Nine Articles were ratified by the Queen, and the bishops and clergy were required to assent.

References

1577 deaths
People educated at Eton College
Alumni of King's College, Cambridge
Fellows of King's College, Cambridge
Bishops of Rochester
Bishops of Salisbury
16th-century Church of England bishops
Archdeacons of Canterbury
People from Northallerton
1513 births